Clube de Regatas do Flamengo Superleague Formula team is the racing team of Clube de Regatas do Flamengo, a football team that competes in Brazil in the Série A. The Flamengo racing team competes in the Superleague Formula. It was operated by Team Astromega during the first season.

2008 season
In the 2008 Superleague Formula season Flamengo finished overall in the 15th position. The car was drove in all rounds by Tuka Rocha.

2009 season
Flamengo will compete in the 2009 Superleague Formula season with the car being driven by ex-F1 and IndyCar racer Enrique Bernoldi.

Record
(key)

2008

2009
Super Final results in 2009 did not count for points towards the main championship.

2010

References

External links
 CR Flamengo Superleague Formula team minisite
 Official CR Flamengo football club website

CR Flamengo
Superleague Formula club teams
Sports teams in Rio de Janeiro (city)
2008 establishments in Brazil